Taurus was a female Crunk&B trio–consisting of Doma, Notation & Jazz–that became slightly known for their heavily Salt-N-Pepa-influenced debut single "Taurus Here" in 2005. In January 2006, the trio made their first public television appearances on the now-defunct musical series, Showtime at the Apollo and Soul Train, to perform their single, "Taurus Here".

In 2007, the group was requested by the New Jersey Nets to sing the National Anthem. That same year, the group released another single titled, "Get Out My Bed", which featured production by Mr. Collipark and guest rap verses from rapper, Hurricane Chris. By the year's end, Taurus had departed from their label, Landmine Entertainment, and their self-titled debut album was shelved.

Singles

Guest appearances

References

American crunk groups
African-American musical groups
American rhythm and blues musical groups
American girl groups
Women hip hop groups
American hip hop singers
British musical trios
Rappers from Atlanta
Southern hip hop groups